The Offset Alpine fire was a 1993 fire that destroyed a Sydney printing plant owned by the company Offset Alpine Printing Ltd. Investigations of the incident by the police and by the Australian Securities & Investments Commission spanned over ten years, amid suspicions that the printing plant was burnt down as part of an insurance fraud. It also gained attention because of the high profile of individuals involved.

Background
In 1992 Stroika, an Australian Securities Exchange listed company called Stroika controlled by Rene Rivkin, bought the Offset Alpine printing firm from Kerry Packer for $15.3 million. On Christmas Eve, 1993, the firm's sole asset, the printing plant, was destroyed by fire. It had been insured at replacement value ($53.2 million), more than three times its purchase price, and the share price skyrocketed. The fire was blamed on a staff barbecue, but suspicions of arson have persisted.

Known investors included:
 Rene Rivkin, a Sydney stockbroker and entrepreneur
 Graham Richardson, a former Labor Senator and associate of Kerry Packer
 Eddie Obeid, a Labor politician 
 Trevor Kennedy, a businessman and former Packer executive
 Rodney Adler, an entrepreneur  
 Sean Howard, a businessman and one of the founders of internet company OzEmail
 Bill Hayden, a former Labor leader and Governor-General of Australia 
 Ray Martin, a television personality who appeared on the Packers' Nine Network

The Australian Securities & Investments Commission (ASIC) commenced an investigation into the ownership of a 38% stake in the company via secret Swiss bank accounts. Rivkin denied any knowledge of the ownership of the stake at the time, but in 2003 ASIC discovered that he himself, in partnership with Richardson and Kennedy, had been using Swiss bank accounts to trade in Offset Alpine and other companies. Rivkin committed suicide in 2005, before the investigation was completed, after being jailed on an unrelated insider trading matter. In January 2006 after a two-year legal battle, ASIC gained access to the relevant Swiss banking records. In September 2006 it was revealed that Richardson had almost $1.5 million in Swiss accounts which he had failed to declare to the Australian Taxation Office.

In 2010 ASIC discontinued its investigation.

References

Further reading

 

1993 fires in Oceania
1993 in Australia
Fires in Australia
Insurance fraud
Arson in Australia
Crime in Sydney
1990s in Sydney